Poll Ramchandrarao Ashokanand (born 27 November 1940) is an Indian former cricketer. He played first-class cricket for Hyderabad, Madras and Mysore between 1957 and 1972.

See also
 List of Hyderabad cricketers

References

External links
 

1940 births
Living people
Indian cricketers
Hyderabad cricketers
Tamil Nadu cricketers
Karnataka cricketers
People from Tumkur